Songs About Fucking Steve Albini is an album by electronic music artist Kid606. It was released on compact disc by Important Records. All of the samples used on the album are from analog sources, according to the Important Records press release. The album cover and title are both a reference to Big Black's album Songs About Fucking, of which Steve Albini was lead singer and guitarist. All of the track titles are anagrams of "Miguel De Pedro", Kid606's real name.

Track listing
All songs written by Miguel De Pedro.

See also
 Songs About Fucking, Big Black album
 Steve Albini

References

External links
Important Records press release
Discogs release

2010 albums
Kid606 albums
Important Records albums